Abarenicola is a genus of polychaetes belonging to the family Arenicolidae.

The genus has almost cosmopolitan distribution.

Species:

Abarenicola affinis 
Abarenicola assimilis 
Abarenicola brevior 
Abarenicola claparedi 
Abarenicola devia 
Abarenicola gilchristi 
Abarenicola haswelli 
Abarenicola insularum 
Abarenicola oceanica
Abarenicola pacifica 
Abarenicola pusilla

References

Annelids